Walter William Kinney (September 9, 1893 – July 1, 1971) was a pitcher in Major League Baseball who played for the Boston Red Sox (1918) and Philadelphia Athletics (1919–20, 1923). Kinney batted and threw left-handed. He was born in Denison, Texas.

In a four-season career, Kinney posted an 11–20 record with 129 strikeouts and a 3.59 earned run average in  innings pitched.

He was a better than average hitting pitcher, posting a .280 batting average (35-for-125) with 17 runs, 2 home runs, 18 RBI and 12 bases on balls.

Kinney died in Escondido, California, at the age of 77.

References

External links

Boston Red Sox players
Philadelphia Athletics players
Major League Baseball pitchers
Baseball players from Texas
People from Denison, Texas
Sportspeople from Escondido, California
1893 births
1971 deaths
Denison Champions players
Oakland Oaks (baseball) players
Denison Railroaders players
Dallas Giants players
Portland Beavers players
Hollywood Stars players
Dallas Steers players
Mission Reds players